The Liverpool Council election, 2011 to the city of Liverpool council happened on the same day as the 2011 United Kingdom local elections and the 2011 United Kingdom Alternative Vote referendum on 5 May.

Councillors elected at the 2007 Liverpool Council election defended their seats this year.

Following the election the composition of the council was:

Election result

Ward Results

* - Councillor seeking re-election

Allerton & Hunt Cross

Anfield

Belle Vale

Central

Childwall

Church

Clubmoor

County

Cressington

Croxteth

Everton

Fazakerley

Greenbank

Kensington & Fairfield

Kirkdale

Knotty Ash

Mossley Hill

Norris Green

Old Swan

Picton

Prince's Park

Riverside

St Michael's

Speke-Garston

Tuebrook & Stoneycroft

Warbreck

Wavertree

West Derby

Woolton

Yew Tree

By Elections

References 

2011
2011 English local elections
2010s in Liverpool